RC Yangiyer (RK Yangier)  is a Uzbekistani rugby club in Yangiyer.

References

Uzbekistani rugby union teams